Magdalena Wójcik (born 2 September 1975 in Krasnystaw, Poland) is a Polish singer and lead member of the Polish band Goya.

Wójcik participated in numerous amateur activities in music, singing and playing guitar from a high school age. In 1993, she released her own album which was published on cassette by the publisher Dalmafon.

In the mid-1990s she signed a multi-year contract with the record company EMI Pomaton. In 1995, along with guitarist Grzegorz Jędrachem and keyboardist Rafał Gorączowski, she co-founded the Polish band Goya. In 1998 the band released their first album, titled Goya.

Discography
  
 Solo albums
 Utkane z wyobrażeń (2010)

References

External links
 

1975 births
Living people
Polish pop singers
Polish rock singers
21st-century Polish singers
21st-century Polish women singers